The Chery Tiggo Crossovers are a professional women's volleyball team in the Premier Volleyball League (PVL). The team is owned by United Asia Automotive Group, Inc. (UAAGI).

The team debuted in the Philippine Superliga (PSL) during the 2014 Grand Prix as the Foton Tornadoes. Heading to the 2020 season, the team was renamed to Chery Tiggo Crossovers.

On March 10, 2021, the team announced it has joined the professional PVL. They became the first-ever volleyball champions in a fully-professional league when they won the 2021 PVL Open Conference title.

International tournaments

As the champion of the 2015 PSL Grand Prix, Foton represented the Philippines, playing as Foton Pilipinas, in the 2016 Asian Women's Club Volleyball Championship held in Biñan, Laguna. The team was reinforced by three selected players from other PSL teams as well as imports Lindsay Stalzer and Ariel Usher. Italian coach and FIVB volleyball instructor Fabio Menta was named as head coach of the squad. The team finished in 7th place overall after the 9-day competition.

Having won the 2016 Grand Prix, the team was entered once more to the 2017 edition of the Asian Women's Club Volleyball Championship. However, the club begged off because of its depleted lineup due to player movements and injuries. In its place, the Philippines was represented by the PSL all-star selection (playing as "Rebisco-PSL Manila").

The team was invited again to take part in the 2021 edition of the Asian Club Championship after winning the 2021 PVL Open Conference. However they declined to enter due to COVID-19 pandemic-related concerns.

Name changes
Foton Motors (2014 PSL Grand Prix Conference)
 
Foton Tornadoes (2014–2017)
  
Foton Toplanders (2016 Invitational Cup)
 
Foton Pilipinas (2016 Asian Women's Club Volleyball Championship)
  
Foton Tornadoes Blue Energy (2018–2019)
 
Chery Tiggo Crossovers (2020–present)
  
United Auctioneers (2021 Beach Challenge Cup)
  
Chery Tiggo Crossovers (2021–present)

Current roster

For the 2023 Premier Volleyball League All-Filipino Conference:

Coaching staff
 Head coach: Aaron Vélez 
 Assistant coaches: Brian Esquibel
 Assistant coaches: Clarence Esteban 

Team staff
 Team manager: 

Medical staff
 Physical therapist: Maco Pili

Position Main 

The following is the Chery Tiggo Crossovers roster in the : 2022 PVL Open Conference

Coaching staff
 Head coach: Aaron Vélez
 Assistant coaches: Brian Esquibel
 Assistant coaches: Adjet Mabbayad
 Trainer(S): Tina Salak
Team staff
 Team manager: Diane Santiago

Medical staff
 Physical therapist: Maco Pili

 Team Captain
 Draft Pick
 Rookie
 Inactive
 Suspended
 Free Agent
 Withdrew
 Injured

Previous roster 

For the 2022 Premier Volleyball League Reinforced Conference:

Coaching staff
 Head coach: Clarence Esteban 
 Assistant coaches: Brian Esquibel
 Assistant coaches: Edjet Mabbayad

Team staff
 Team manager: Diane Santiago
Medical staff
 Physical therapist: Maco Pili

For the 2022 Premier Volleyball League Invitational Conference:

Coaching staff
 Head coach: Clarence Esteban 
 Assistant coaches: Brian Esquibel
 Assistant coaches: Edjet Mabbayad

Team staff
 Team manager: Diane Santiago
Medical staff
 Physical therapist: Maco Pili

For the 2022 Premier Volleyball League Open Conference:

Coaching staff
 Head coach: Aaron Vélez
 Assistant coaches: Brian Esquibel
 Assistant coaches: Edjet Mabbayad

Team staff
 Team manager: Diane Santiago
Medical staff
 Physical therapist: Maco Pili

 

For the 2021 Premier Volleyball League Open Conference:

Coaching staff
 Head coach: Aaron Vélez
 Assistant coaches: Brian Esquibel
 Assistant coaches: Edjet Mabbayad

Team staff
 Team manager: Diane Santiago
Medical staff
 Physical therapist: Maco Pili

For the 2020 PSL Grand Prix Conference:

Coaching staff
 Head coach: Aaron Vélez
 Assistant coaches: Brian Esquibel
 Assistant coaches: Edjet Mabbayad

Team staff
 Team manager: Diane Santiago
Medical staff
 Physical therapist: Maco Pili

For the 2019 PSL Grand Prix Conference:

Coaching staff
 Head coach: Aaron Vélez
 Assistant coaches: Brian Esquibel
 Assistant coaches: Adjet Mabbayad
Team staff
 Team manager: Diane Santiago

Medical staff
 Physical therapist: Maco Pili

 Team Captain
 Import
 Draft Pick
 Rookie
 Inactive
 Suspended
 Free Agent
 Withdrew
 Injured

 
 

For the 2018 PSL All-Filipino Conference:

Coaching staff
 Head coach: Aaron Vélez
 Assistant coaches: Brian Esquibel

Team staff
 Team manager: Diane Santiago

Medical staff
 Team physician: Ma. Luisa Bautista
 Physical therapist: Maco Pili

 

For the 2018 PSL Invitational Cup:

Coaching staff
 Head coach: Aaron Velez
 Assistant coaches: Brian Esquibel

Team staff
 Team manager: Diane Santiago

Medical staff
 Team physician: Ma. Luisa Bautista
 Physical therapist: Maco Pili

 

For the 2018 PSL Grand Prix Conference:

Coaching staff
 Head coach: Rommel Abella
 Assistant coaches: Edget Mabbayad  Brian Esquibel

Team staff
 Team manager: Diane Santiago

Medical staff
 Team physician: Ma. Luisa Bautista
 Physical therapist: Maco Pili

 
 

For the 2017 PSL Grand Prix Conference:

Coaching staff
 Head coach: Moro Branislav
 Assistant coaches: Edget Mabbayad  Brian Esquibel

Team staff
 Team manager: Diane Santiago

Medical staff
 Team physician: Ma. Luisa Bautista
 Physical therapist: Maco Pili

 

Coaching staff
 Head coach: Moro Branislav
 Assistant coaches: Ronald Dulay Brian Esquibel

Team staff
 Team manager: Diane Santiago

Medical staff
 Team physician: Ma. Luisa Bautista
 Physical therapist: Maco Pili

 

For the 2017 PSL All-Filipino Conference:

Coaching staff
 Head coach: Moro Branislav
 Assistant coaches: Ronald Dulay Brian Esquibel

Team staff
 Team manager: Diane Santiago

Medical staff
 Team physician: Ma. Luisa Bautista
 Physical therapist: Maco Pili

 
 

For the 2016 Philippine Super Liga Grand Prix Conference:

Coaching Staff
 Head coach: Moro Branislav
 Assistant coaches: Ronald Dulay Brian Esquibel

Team Staff
 Team Manager: Diane Santiago

Medical Staff
 Team Physician: Ma. Luisa Bautista
 Physical Therapist: Maco Pili

 

For the 2016 PSL All-Filipino Conference:

Coaching staff
 Head coach: Ma. Vilet Ponce De Leon
 Assistant coaches: Ronald Dulay Christian Fernandez

Team Staff
 Team Manager: Alvin Lu

Medical Staff
 Physical Therapist: Katherine Tenorio

 

For the 2016 PSL Beach Volleyball Challenge Cup

For the 2016 PSL Invitational Cup:

Coaching staff
 Head coach: Ma. Vilet Ponce De Leon
 Assistant coaches: Ronald Dulay Christian Fernandez

Team Staff
 Team Manager: Alvin Lu

Medical Staff
 Physical Therapist: Jose Mari Angulo

 
 

For the 2015 PSL Grand Prix Conference:

Coaching staff
 Head coach: Ma. Vilet Ponce De Leon
 Assistant coach(s): Ronald Dulay Christian Fernandez

Team Staff
 Team Manager: Alvin Lu 

Medical Staff
 Team Physician: Katherine Tenorio
 Physical Therapist: Jose Mari Angulo

 

For the 2015 PSL Beach Volleyball Challenge Cup:

Coaching staff
 Head coach:
 Assistant coach(s):

Team Staff
 Team Manager:
 Team Utility: 

Medical Staff
 Team Physician:
 Physical Therapist:

For the 2015 PSL All-Filipino Conference:

Coaching staff
 Head coach: Vilet Ponce De Leon
 Assistant coach(s): Ronald Dulay Christian Fernandez

Team Staff
 Team Manager: Alvin Lu
 Team Utility: 

Medical Staff
 Team Physician: Jose Mari Angulo
 Physical Therapist: Alyssa Paula Tomas

 
 

For 2014 PSL Grand Prix Conference:

Coaching staff
 Head coach: Vilet Ponce De Leon
 Assistant coach(s): Ronald Dulay Christian Fernandez

Team Staff
 Team Manager: Alvin Lu
 Team Utility: 

Medical Staff
 Team Physician: Jose Mari Angulo
 Physical Therapist: Alyssa Paula Tomas

Honors

Team
Premier Volleyball League:

Philippine Superliga:

PNVF Champions League:

International:

Individual
Premier Volleyball League:

PNVF Champions League:

Philippine Superliga:

Team captains
  Jill Gustilo (2014)
  Ivy Remulla (2015)
  Angeli Araneta (2016 - 2016)
  Lindsay Stalzer (2016)
  Aleona Denise Manabat (2017, 2018)
  Alyja Daphne Santiago (2017 - 2017, 2021)
  Maika Angela Ortiz (2018 - 2019, 2022) 
  Carmina Aganon (2019)
  Shaya Adorador (2019)
  Tatjana Bokan (2020)
  Jasmine Nabor (2022)
  Mylene Paat (2022 - present)

Imports

Coaches
  Ma. Vilet Ponce-de León (2014–2016)
  Fabio Menta (2016; Asian Women's Club Championship)
  Moro Branislav (2016–2017)
  Rommel Abella (2018; PSL Grand Prix)
  Edjet Mabbayad (2018; PSL Invitational)
  Aaron Vélez (2018-2022)
  Clarence Esteban (2022–present)

References

External links
 

Premier Volleyball League
2014 establishments in the Philippines
Volleyball clubs established in 2014
Premier Volleyball League (Philippines)
Women's volleyball teams in the Philippines